Jesús Flores (born 27 September 1973) is a Mexican boxer. He competed in the men's welterweight event at the 1996 Summer Olympics.

References

External links
 

1973 births
Living people
Mexican male boxers
Olympic boxers of Mexico
Boxers at the 1996 Summer Olympics
Place of birth missing (living people)
Welterweight boxers